Two Days, One Night is a 2014 drama film written and directed by the Dardenne brothers, starring Marion Cotillard and Fabrizio Rongione. It is an international co-production between Belgium, France and Italy. The film competed for the Palme d'Or in the main competition section at the 2014 Cannes Film Festival. It won the Sydney Film Prize at the 2014 Sydney Film Festival, was nominated for a BAFTA Award for Best Film Not in the English Language, nominated for two César Awards and for nine Magritte Awards, winning three, including Best Film and Best Director for Jean-Pierre and Luc Dardenne. The film was selected as Belgium's submission for the Academy Award for Best Foreign Language Film at the 87th Academy Awards, but was not nominated, though Cotillard received a Best Actress nomination for her performance in the film, making her the first actor to be nominated for a Belgian film.

Plot
In Seraing, an industrial town near Liège, Belgium, young wife and mother Sandra prepares to return to work at Solwal, a small solar-panel factory, after a medical leave of absence for depression and anxiety. During her absence, Solwal management realises her colleagues are able to cover her shifts by working slightly longer hours and proposes a €1,000 bonus to each if they agree to make Sandra redundant. On Friday evening, after Sandra hears the news and that only two of the 16 voted for her to stay, she breaks down, feeling hopeless and worthless.

Her husband, Manu, tries to lift her spirits. A co-worker friend Juliette, who voted on her behalf, convinces her to talk to M. Dumont, the Solwal manager. Sandra is too petrified to speak, but Juliette argues her case. Juliette tells him some of the workers felt pressured to vote against Sandra by the factory foreman Jean-Marc, who insinuated one job must be eliminated. Though hesitant, Dumont agrees to a second, secret ballot early Monday.

Realising that her fate rests in the hands of her co-workers, Sandra must visit each of the 14 over the course of the weekend to persuade them to reject the monetary bonus, and she faces an uphill battle to keep her job before the crucial vote on Monday. Most of her co-workers are counting on the bonus for their own families. Some of her co-workers are immigrants and some are already working second jobs to get by; most react with sympathy, but a few with anger. Sandra is crushed when a co-worker she considered a friend pretends not to be home, but is heartened by the few who support her and say they will vote for her. Timur, an immigrant from Dagestan, breaks down in tears and says he is ashamed of himself, as Sandra covered for him when he broke a panel on his first day. He says he will change his mind and talk to another worker on her behalf.

On Sunday afternoon, Sandra discovers that Jean-Marc has been calling their co-workers to convince them not to change their votes, and that in reality he is against Sandra coming back because of her depression. She visits her co-worker Anne, whose husband rudely throws her out and screams at both women. Dejected, Sandra attempts suicide at home by overdosing on Xanax, but when Anne arrives to tell her she will vote for her, Sandra confesses to Manu, who forces her to vomit the pills up. Sandra recovers at the hospital and is touched when she finds out Anne came to the hospital too. Sandra tells Manu they will visit the remaining three that evening. When Anne tells her she has decided to leave her husband, Sandra invites her to their house to spend the night.

Sandra speaks to Alphonse, a young African immigrant who is working as a welder on contract. He will only get €150 because he is new, but he is afraid of Jean-Marc, who told him to vote against Sandra if he wants to get along with his co-workers. Alphonse tells her he wants to vote for her, but he's afraid Jean-Marc will find out and write him up for his mistakes, which could damage his chance of renewing his contract when it expires in September.

On Monday morning, as the Solwal workers vote again, Jean-Marc reacts angrily to Sandra. She stands up for herself and reminds him that he acted unfairly. In the second ballot, eight vote for her to keep the job, and eight vote to keep the bonus – not enough to overturn Friday's vote. She tearfully thanks those who voted for her, including Alphonse. She tells Anne she can stay at their house again that night and stoically clears out her locker.

However, Dumont calls her into his office and congratulates her on convincing so many to support her. He tells her he has decided to give everyone the bonus but still keep her on. Sandra's joy is short lived as he explains he will simply not renew a worker whose contract expires in September – Alphonse. Sandra politely declines his offer – she now has the confidence to start anew, and pursue a new life for herself. "We put up a good fight," she tells Manu proudly.

Cast
 Marion Cotillard as Sandra Bya, working-class wife and mother of two children
 Fabrizio Rongione as Manu Bya, Sandra's husband who works as a chef
 Catherine Salée as Juliette, Sandra's friend and co-worker
 Olivier Gourmet as Jean-Marc, Sandra's supervisor at Solwal
 Christelle Cornil as Anne, Sandra's co-worker
 Timur Magomedgadzhiev as Timur, Sandra's co-worker
 Myriem Akheddiou as Mireille
 Pili Groyne as Estelle, daughter of Sandra and Manu 
 Simon Caudry 	as Maxime, son of Sandra and Manu
 Batiste Sornin as M. Dumont, manager at Solwal
 Serge Koto as Alphonse, welder at Solwal

Production
The film was a Belgian production with French and Italian co-producers. It was produced by Dardenne's Les Films du Fleuve with co-production support from France's Archipel 35, Italy's BIM Distribuzione and Belgium's Eyeworks Film & TV Drama. It received funding from the Flemish Audiovisual Fund, RTBF and Centre du cinéma et de l'audiovisuel. It received 500,000 euro from Eurimages. The total budget was seven million euros. Filming began in late June 2013 in Seraing, Belgium and was wrapped in September 2013.

Release
Two Days, One Night premiered at the 2014 Cannes Film Festival on 20 May 2014. The film was released in France on 21 May 2014 through Diaphana, and in Belgium on the same day through Cinéart. It was screened at the Sydney Film Festival on 9 June 2014 and at the Munich Film Festival on 29 June 2014. It was the closing film of the Norwegian Film Festival on 20 August 2014. The film had its North American premiere at the Telluride Film Festival on 29 August 2014 was screened at the Toronto International Film Festival on 9 September 2014, at the New York Film Festival on 5 October 2014, at Hamptons Film Festival on 10 October 2014, at the Mill Valley Film Festival on 11 October 2014 and at the Chicago Film Festival on 16 October 2014. It was the opening film of Valladolid Film Festival on 18 October 2014 and was screened at the Savannah Film Festival on 28 October 2014. and at AFI Fest on 7 November 2014.

The film was released in the United Kingdom via Artificial Eye on 22 August 2014. Sundance Selects distributed the film in the United States on 24 December 2014.

Reception
Two Days, One Night received critical acclaim after its premiere at the 2014 Cannes Film Festival. Cotillard's performance was highly praised and earned a 15-minute standing ovation. The film has an approval of 97% on Rotten Tomatoes based on 185 reviews with an average rating of 8.4/10. The website's critical consensus states: "Another profoundly affecting work from the Dardenne brothers, Two Days, One Night delivers its timely message with honesty and clear-eyed compassion." The film also has a score of 89 out of 100 on Metacritic, based on 38 critics, indicating "universal acclaim".

Empire gave the film five out of five stars and described it as "a rare film of unforced simplicity, with an outstanding lead performance". Empire also chose Two Days, One Night as one of the 50 best films of 2014, ranked at number 44.  The Hollywood Reporter praised the film and stated that it stands alongside Marion Cotillard's best work.

The film won the Sydney Film Prize at Sydney Film Festival "For its masterfully elegant storytelling, its dedication to a fiercely humanistic, super-realist worldview, its brave, essential commitment to community solidarity, and its celebration of a woman's power and vitality," said Jury President Rachel Perkins.  Writing for The Guardian, Peter Bradshaw gave the film 5 stars, praising in particular Cotillard's "supremely intelligent performance."

Nicholas Barber of BBC gave the film four stars, praising Cotillard's performance saying that "she conveys a tremendous amount with the smallest, quietest gestures. When you see the fierce, tearful grin on her face after one successful encounter, and the sleepwalking shuffle she adopts when her depression threatens to engulf her, it’s plain that she is one of the finest cinema actors we have."  Emma Dibdin of Digital Spy gave the film four stars, calling Cotillard "fascinating to watch" and said that "The physical sluggishness and emotional numbing of depression have seldom been better portrayed on screen, and yet Two Days One Night still emerges as a psychologically delving and quietly uplifting modern-day morality play."

The National Board of Review chose the film as one of the Top 5 Foreign Films of 2014.  Time ranked Cotillard's performance in the film as the fourth best performance of 2014, shared with her performance in The Immigrant.

In Spain, filmmaker Pedro Almodóvar made a list of the best films and performances of 2014, and included Cotillard's performance on his list of best foreign actresses.

Accolades
On 19 September 2014, it was announced that Two Days, One Night would be Belgium's submission for the foreign language film category at the 87th Academy Awards.

See also
 List of submissions to the 87th Academy Awards for Best Foreign Language Film
 List of Belgian submissions for the Academy Award for Best Foreign Language Film
 List of films featuring unemployment
 List of films featuring mental disorders

References

External links
 Official website 
 
 
 
 
 
 Two Days, One Night: Economics Is Emotion – an essay by Girish Shambu at The Criterion Collection

2014 films
2014 drama films
2010s French films
2010s French-language films
2010s Italian films
Belgian drama films
Best Foreign Film Guldbagge Award winners
Best French-Language Film Lumières Award winners
Films about depression
Films about the working class
Films directed by the Dardenne brothers
Films set in Belgium
Films shot in Belgium
Films without soundtracks
French drama films
French-language Belgian films
French-language Italian films
Italian drama films
Magritte Award winners